Events from the year 1543 in Sweden

Incumbents
 Monarch – Gustav I

Events

 - The Dacke War to put to an end to the rebellion led by Nils Dacke is concluded. 
 - Conrad von Pyhy is deposed office. 
 - The first book in the Finnish language is published: Abckiria by Mikael Agricola.
 - The monarch has the library and archives of the Vadstena Abbey sealed and removed.

Births

 - Nils Svantesson Sture, diplomat  (died 1567)

Deaths

 - Nils Dacke, rebel leader

References

 
Years of the 16th century in Sweden
Sweden